The Drama Desk Award for Outstanding Musical is an annual award presented by Drama Desk in recognition of achievements in the theatre among Broadway, Off Broadway and Off-Off Broadway productions.

Winners and nominees

1970s

1980s

1990s

2000s

2010s

2020s

See also
 Laurence Olivier Award for Best New Musical
 Tony Award for Best Musical

References
 

Notes

External links
 Drama Desk official website

Musical